Hermsen is a Dutch patronymic surname meaning "son of Herm" (a short form of Herman). Notable people with the surname include:

André Hermsen (born 1942), Dutch water polo player, brother of Henk and Wim
Henk Hermsen (born 1937), Dutch water polo player, brother of André and Wim
 (born 1982), Dutch hardcore techno musician known as "Tha Playah"
Kleggie Hermsen (1923–1994), American basketball player
Toine Hermsen (born 1954), Dutch chef and restaurant owner
Wim Hermsen (born 1947), Dutch water polo player and astronomer, brother of André and Henk

See also
Harmsen

References

Dutch-language surnames
Patronymic surnames

de:Hermsen